Burt Flickinger Center is a multipurpose indoor venue located in downtown Buffalo, New York. 

The venue is named after Burt Prentice Flickinger, Jr., an heir to the S.M. Flickinger food distribution company who spearheaded efforts to bring the 1993 World University Games to Buffalo.

The venue was originally constructed for the 1993 World University Games and is now used full-time by the Erie Kats, SUNY Erie's athletic program. The City Campus of SUNY Erie is across the street within the Old Post Office. The facility contains a field house that seats 3,200 and an Olympic-sized swimming pool that seats 1,500.

The venue hosted several professional wrestling shows from the ECW promotion between 1997 and 2000, including November to Remember 1999.

Joe Mesi defeated Anthony Green to win the New York State Heavyweight Championship during a professional boxing card at the venue in 1999.

The venue was formerly home to the Buffalo Rapids of the American Basketball Association in 2005 and the Buffalo 716ers of the American Basketball Association in 2015.

The venue has been the home of Canisius Golden Griffins swimming and diving meets since 2011.

References

External links
Burt Flickinger Center on BoxRec
Burt Flickinger Center on WrestlingData.com

1993 establishments in New York (state)
American Basketball Association (2000–present) venues
Basketball venues in New York (state)
Boxing venues in New York (state)
Buildings and structures in Buffalo, New York
College basketball venues in the United States
College swimming venues in the United States
Sports venues completed in 1993
Sports venues in Buffalo, New York
Sports venues in Erie County, New York
Sports venues in New York (state)
Swimming venues in New York (state)
Wrestling venues in New York (state)